Guy Denis Wilson (30 November 1882 – 30 November 1917) was an English cricketer who played for Derbyshire in 1902 and 1905. He was killed in action during the First World War.

Wilson was born in Melbourne, Derbyshire, the son of Arthur Wilson MA JP. He was educated at Derby School where he captained the cricket and football XI, was an all-round athlete, and was a captain in the Cadet Corps in 1900/1901. He played one first-class match for Derbyshire in the 1902 season against W.G.Grace's London County but made little impact in the match. His second game came in the 1905 season against Marylebone Cricket Club (MCC) when again he made little impression. He played 4 innings in 2 first-class matches with an average of 4.75 and a top score of 9. He took no wickets in the six overs he bowled.

In 1908 Wilson was commissioned into the 1st Derbyshire Howitzer Battery of the Territorial Force as a Second lieutenant. He saw active service in the First World War, becoming a captain in the Royal Field Artillery. He was killed in France on his 35th birthday during the Battle of Cambrai of 1917.

References 

1882 births
1917 deaths
People educated at Derby School
Derbyshire cricketers
English cricketers
Royal Field Artillery officers
British Army personnel of World War I
British military personnel killed in World War I
Military personnel from Derbyshire